Josef Ondřej Kranner, or Joseph Andreas Kranner (13 June 1801, Prague - 20 October 1871, Vienna) was a Czech architect. He became the first Master Builder at St. Vitus Cathedral when construction resumed there in 1861.

Life and work 
He was the tenth child born to Jan Ludvík Kranner (1764–1828), an Imperial Master Builder and stonemason. He completed his apprenticeship as a stonemason while attending Prague Polytechnic. This was followed by studies at the Academy of Fine Arts, Vienna. In 1822, he made study trips to Venice and Rome. Two years later he travelled to Paris, via Marseilles.

His first project as a Master Builder involved designing a family crypt for the Austrian State Chancellor, Prince Klemens von Metternich at his castle in Plasy. When this was completed in 1828, he took over his recently deceased father's studio; introducing modern methods he had observed in France. In 1830, he received his certificate as a Master Builder for Prague, followed in 1835 by that city's recognition of his status as a Master Stonemason.

He was deeply interested in the Medieval buildings of his homeland. Together with the historian František Palacký, the painter Josef Vojtěch Hellich, and the architect , he created a book on ancient Bohemia. It was edited by Hellich and the cultural revivalist, Jan Erazim Vocel, and published in 1845 under the title "Grundzüge der böhmischen Alterthumskunde" (Basics of Bohemian Antiquity).

In 1844, they presented a program for renovation. While these plans were being considrered, he entered a competition for designing a church dedicated to Saints Cyril and Methodius, but his design was rejected for being "Too German". Beginning around 1855, he was involved in managing construction of the Votivkirche in Vienna.

The first meeting of the Cathedral Building Association would not take place until 1859. At the second meeting, in 1860, it was proposed that he be given the official position of Master Builder for the project. Kranner would head the work from 1861 to 1866; consisting mostly of repairs. In 1867, he presented complete plans for a three-aisle expansion of the cathedral. He died before that phase of the project was completed, and Josef Mocker was appointed to replace him as manager.

Sources

External links 

1801 births
1871 deaths
Czech architects
Builders
Academy of Fine Arts Vienna alumni
Stonemasons
Architects from Prague